The 1923 Whitechapel and St Georges by-election was a parliamentary by-election for the British House of Commons constituency of Whitechapel and St Georges on 8 February 1923.

Vacancy
The by-election was caused by the death of the sitting Labour MP, Charles James Mathew on 8 January 1923. Mathew died, aged 50, after an operation, seven weeks after his election, becoming one of the shortest-serving MPs in history.

Election history
The constituency was created for the 1918 general election. The area had been a Liberal stronghold and despite the Conservative candidate being endorsed by the Coalition government, the Liberals won a four-cornered contest. At the following general election, Labour narrowly gained the seat. The result was;

Candidates
 The local Labour Party selected 61-year-old Harry Gosling to defend the seat. Gosling first stood for election to Parliament as a Liberal Party candidate at the December 1910 general election but failed to win a seat at Lambeth North. He stood as a Labour Party candidate in Uxbridge at the next general election in 1918, but was again defeated. At the following general election in 1922, he was again defeated as a Labour candidate at Kennington. He was also a member of the London County Council since 1898, representing St George's-in-the-East until 1919 and Kennington thereafter. In 1920 Labour formally became a separate party within the council, and Gosling became the first leader of the Labour group. 
 The local Liberal Party re-selected 57-year-old James Kiley to regain the seat. Kiley had sat as Liberal MP for Whitechapel from 1916 to 1918 and then for Whitechapel and St Georges from 1918 until his defeat in 1922. In 1910, he was elected to Stepney Borough Council, becoming an alderman in 1913 and serving as the borough's mayor in 1915. He was also a member of the Metropolitan Water Board from 1914 to 1922.
 At a meeting of the National Prohibition Party in London on 15 January 1923, attendees decided to intervene in the by-election, fielding S. M. Holden, of Huncoat, Lancashire. The party platform centred on the support for the banning of alcohol. Holden had contested Accrington at the 1906 general election, coming third.
On 22 January, the local Conservative Association met and decided not to contest the by-election.

Campaign
Polling day was set for 8 February 1923, exactly one month after the death of Mathew. Nominations closed on 31 January 1923; it transpired that there would be a three-cornered contest between Labour's Gosling, the Liberal Kiley and the Prohibitionist Holden.

Leading Liberal Sir John Simon, who had gained a seat from Labour at the 1922 general election, came to speak in support of Kiley.

Holden's campaign received the active support of Edwin Scrymgeour, who had been elected to parliament for Dundee at the 1922 general election on behalf of the Scottish Prohibition Party.
British Pathe film of Holden opening his campaign;
http://www.britishpathe.com/video/englands-first-prohibitionist-m-p/query/CAMPAIGNING+BY

Result
The Labour Party held the seat.

Aftermath
Gosling and Kiley went head-to-head again at the General election later in the year with the same outcome;

The National Prohibition Party did not contest another parliamentary seat. Holden did not stand for parliament again until 1929 when he contested Preston as an Independent candidate.

References

See also
 List of United Kingdom by-elections
 United Kingdom by-election records
 

Whitechapel and St George's by-election
Whitechapel and St George's,1923
Whitechapel and St George's by-election
Whitechapel and St George's by-election
Whitechapel and St George's,1923